Hancock Chapel is an unincorporated community in Harrison County, Indiana, in the United States.

History
The former post office serving Hancock Chapel was called Hancock. It operated from 1852 until 1907.

References

Unincorporated communities in Harrison County, Indiana
Unincorporated communities in Indiana